Brandon Breaux is a multi-disciplinary artist from the South Side of Chicago whose work includes oil-on-canvas and digital art.

Early life and education
Breaux grew up in the Chatham and Grand Crossing neighborhoods on the South Side of Chicago. Breaux graduated from DePaul University  in 2006.

Career
Breaux created the cover art to the 2012 Chance the Rapper debut mixtape  10 DAY.  Breaux also created the cover art for the  Acid Rap and Coloring Book mixtapes,   and  Chance's 2018 singles "Wala Cam", "65th and Ingleside" and "Work Out".

Breaux shot the original photo and created the cover art for  Acid Rap. The picture happened by chance, according to Breaux: "I had made these tie-dye tank tops before we went to SXSW and I gave them to Chance… In the back of my mind I'm like I hope you wear this."

The cover artwork  Breaux created for Coloring Book depicted Chance holding his baby daughter, capturing his facial expression but with the baby outside the frame of the image.

Following the publication of the cover art for Chance the Rapper, artists including Drake, Kehlani, Miguel, and Troye Sivan have released album cover art showing Breaux's influence.  

His debut U.S. solo exhibition, BIG WORDS,  included painting, print, and fashion design, and was curated by Anna Cerniglia and Alison Cuddy for Blanc Gallery. In a review for Dazed, Vanessa Murrell noted the exhibition's use of typography and figures to stimulate the viewer's right and left brain functions. 

Breaux's commissioned portraiture work includes fashion icon André Leon Talley for the cover of Ebony, and civil rights pioneer Congressman John Lewis for the cover of his final published work, Carry On: Reflections for a New Generation.

In 2020, Breaux collaborated with the Museum of Contemporary Art on  a capsule collection.

In 2022, Breaux was selected in a cohort of 14 master artists and designers to be part of Dorchester Industries Experimental Design Lab, a partnership of the Prada Group, Theaster Gates Studio, Dorchester Industries, and Rebuild Foundation.

In 2022 Breaux was selected for the  "Office Hours"  artist residency  at the Kennedy Center in Washington, DC.

Awards and honors
Ebony magazine named Breaux in the 2022 EBONY Power 100  list of Black leaders in business, STEM, sports, media, activism, music and entertainment.

References

External links

1983 births
Living people
DePaul University alumni
African-American painters
Artists from Chicago
21st-century African-American artists
Chance the Rapper
African-American contemporary artists
American contemporary artists